The Paramo hocicudo (Oxymycterus paramensis) is a species of rodent in the family Cricetidae.
It is found in Argentina, Bolivia, and Peru. The Argentine hocicudo is sometimes considered conspecific.

References

 Baillie, J. 1996.  Oxymycterus paramensis.   2006 IUCN Red List of Threatened Species.   Downloaded on 19 July 2007.
Musser, G. G. and M. D. Carleton. 2005. Superfamily Muroidea. pp. 894–1531 in Mammal Species of the World a Taxonomic and Geographic Reference. D. E. Wilson and D. M. Reeder eds. Johns Hopkins University Press, Baltimore.

Oxymycterus
Fauna of the Andes
Rodents of South America
Mammals of Argentina
Mammals of Bolivia
Mammals of Peru
Páramo fauna
Mammals described in 1902
Taxa named by Oldfield Thomas
Taxonomy articles created by Polbot